Frank H. Hyland (1880–1934) was a North Dakota Republican Party politician who served as the 13th Lieutenant Governor of North Dakota under Governor Ragnvald A. Nestos. Hyland also served in the North Dakota House from 1911 to 1912, and in the North Dakota Senate from 1913 to 1920 and 1929 to 1932.

Notes

1880 births
1934 deaths
Lieutenant Governors of North Dakota
Republican Party members of the North Dakota House of Representatives
Republican Party North Dakota state senators
20th-century American politicians